Human Horizons Technology (widely known as Human Horizons) is a Chinese company based in Shanghai that makes electric cars under the HiPhi brand and develops autonomous driving technology. It operates its production and assembly smart plant in Yancheng, Jiangsu Province, and its parts boutique prototype factory in Jinqiao, Shanghai.

History
Human Horizons was founded in August 2017 by Ding Lei.

The company's headquarters is in Shanghai, and the Human Horizons name was unveiled on October 25, 2018, alongside three Human Horizons concept cars.

On July 31, 2019, HiPhi brand was launched alongside its first concept car, the HiPhi 1 concept.

References

External links
Official website

Electric vehicle manufacturers of China
Vehicle manufacturing companies established in 2017
Chinese companies established in 2017